Lake Bonilla is a freshwater lake in the Limón province of Costa Rica.

Location 

The Bonilla and Bonillita lakes are located in a private property next to Reventazón River, and 9.66 kilometers SW of the Reventazón Dam.

Physical aspects 

Lake Bonilla is of landslide origin.

Conservation area 

The Bonilla-Bonillita Lacustrine Wetland created in 1994 is composed by this lake and Lake Lancaster Arriba, Lake Lancaster Abajo and Lake Bonillita and their surrounding areas.

See also 
 List of lakes in Costa Rica

References 

Geography of Limón Province
Tourist attractions in Limón Province
Bonilla